Agromyces iriomotensis is a Gram-negative bacterium from the genus of Agromyces which has been isolated from soil from a pineapple field from Okinawa in Japan.

References 

Microbacteriaceae
Bacteria described in 2014